The Third Pourier cabinet was the 21st cabinet of the Netherlands Antilles.

Composition
The cabinet was composed as follows:

|Minister of General Affairs and Development Cooperation
|Miguel Pourier
|PAR
|8 November 1999
|-
|Minister of the Interior, Labor and Social Affairs
|Lucille George-Wout
|PAR
|8 November 1999
|-
|Minister of Justice
|Rutsel Martha
|PNP
|8 November 1999
|-
|Minister for the National Recovery Plan and Economic Affairs
|Suzanne Camelia-Römer
|PNP
|8 November 1999
|-
|Minister of Education, Youth, Culture, and Sports
|Stanley Lamp
|MAN
|8 November 1999
|-
|Minister of Traffic and Communications
|Maurice Adriaens
|FOL
|8 November 1999
|-
|Minister of Finance
|Russell Voges
|DP
|8 November 1999
|-
|Minister of Public Health and Hygiene
|Laurenso Abraham
||PDB
||8 November 1999
|}

References

Cabinets of the Netherlands Antilles
1999 establishments in the Netherlands Antilles
Cabinets established in 1999
Cabinets disestablished in 2002
2002 disestablishments in the Netherlands Antilles